Christína Papadáki (born 24 February 1973) is a former tennis player from Greece who turned professional in 1989.

Her biggest career achievement was reaching the final of the Copa Colsanitas Seguros Bolivar tournament in 1999, losing to Fabiola Zuluaga and winning the doubles title with Seda Noorlander in the same tournament. Papadaki reached her career-high ranking of world No. 72 in May 1999.

She played in the Fed Cup for Greece every year from 1991 to 1999, and compiled a 30–30 win–loss record in these ties. Papadáki twice represented Greece at the Summer Olympics, in 1992 and 1996. She retired from professional tennis in 1999.

WTA career finals

Singles: 1 runner-up

Doubles: 1 title

ITF finals

Singles (5–4)

Doubles (9–5)

External links
 
 
 
 
 

1973 births
Living people
Greek female tennis players
Olympic tennis players of Greece
Sportspeople from Athens
Tennis players at the 1992 Summer Olympics
Tennis players at the 1996 Summer Olympics
Mediterranean Games gold medalists for Greece
Mediterranean Games medalists in tennis
Competitors at the 1997 Mediterranean Games